Rob Horne (born 15 August 1989) is an Australian former rugby union footballer who played at centre for the Waratahs, Northampton Saints, and Australia.

Early life
Horne attended Lugarno Public School and Georges River College, Oatley Campus. He played club rugby as a junior with Oatley rugby club.

Club career

Super Rugby
Rob Horne made his Super Rugby debut for the Waratahs in 2008 at the age of 18, he came off the bench for Timana Tahu against the Blues. He quickly cemented his place in the team, starting in the 2008 Super 14 Final in which Waratahs lost to Crusaders 20–12.

Premiership Rugby
It was announced on 6 February 2017, that Horne would join English side Northampton Saints for the beginning of the 2017–18 season.

Retirement
After making a big impact in his first season at Northampton Saints Horne was made captain for the first time during the local derby with Leicester Tigers on 14 April 2018. Thirteen seconds into the game, he was injured after tackling Sione Kalamafoni. Medics attended to him for some time on the field before transporting him to Leicester Royal Infirmary. Northampton went on to win the game 21–27. One week later on 21 April 2018 it was announced that Horne had been forced to retire from professional rugby immediately due to injury. After receiving care at the Royal National Orthopaedic Hospital it was confirmed that he had sustained significant, career ending nerve damage to his right arm. He later confirmed in an interview that this damage was to the Brachial Plexus nerves in his right shoulder. This left him with full paralysis of his right arm.

International career
Horne was named as vice-captain for the Wallabies in 2016 alongside Michael Hooper, but was ruled out of game-time for the rest of the year after suffering from a leg injury against New Zealand in Sydney during the opening match of the Bledisloe series.

References

External links
NSW Waratahs Profile
ESPN Profile

1989 births
Australian expatriate sportspeople in England
Australia international rugby union players
Australian rugby union players
New South Wales Waratahs players
Rugby union centres
Rugby union wings
Rugby union players from Sydney
Living people
Northampton Saints players